Isomalt is a sugar substitute, a type of sugar alcohol used primarily for its sugar-like physical properties. It has little to no impact on blood sugar levels, and does not stimulate the release of insulin. It also does not promote tooth decay and is considered to be tooth-friendly.  Its energy value is 2 kcal per gram, half that of sugars. It is less sweet than sugar, but can be blended with high-intensity sweeteners such as sucralose to create a mixture with the same sweetness as sucrose (‘sugar’).

Like most sugar alcohols (including the chemically similar maltitol), isomalt carries a risk of intestinal distress when consumed in large quantities (above about 20–30 g (1 oz) per day). Isomalt may prove upsetting to the intestinal tract because it is incompletely absorbed in the small intestine, and when polyols pass into the large intestine, they can cause osmotically-induced diarrhea and stimulate the gut flora, causing flatulence. As with dietary fibers, regular consumption of isomalt can lead to desensitization, decreasing the risk of intestinal upset.

Isomalt has been approved for use in the United States since 1990. It is also permitted for use in Australia, New Zealand, Canada, Mexico, Iran, the European Union, and other countries.

Composition and structure 

Isomalt is an equimolar mixture of two diastereomeric disaccharides, each composed of two sugars: glucose and mannitol (α-D-glucopyranosido-1,6-mannitol) and also glucose and sorbitol (α-D-glucopyranosido-1,6-sorbitol). Complete hydrolysis of isomalt yields glucose (50%), sorbitol (25%), and mannitol (25%). It is an odorless, white, crystalline substance containing about 5% water of crystallisation. Isomalt has a minimal cooling effect (positive heat of solution), lower than many other sugar alcohols, in particular, xylitol and erythritol.

Manufacture 

Isomalt is manufactured in a two-stage process in which sucrose is first transformed into isomaltulose, a reducing disaccharide (6-O-α-D-glucopyranosido-D-fructose). The isomaltulose is then hydrogenated, using a Raney nickel catalyst. The final product — isomalt — is an equimolar composition of 6-O-α-D-glucopyranosido-D-sorbitol (1,6-GPS) and 1-O-α-D-glucopyranosido-D-mannitol-dihydrate (1,1-GPM-dihydrate).

Uses 

Isomalt is widely used for the production of sugar-free candy, especially hard-boiled candy, because it resists crystallization much better than the standard combinations of sucrose and corn syrup. It is used in sugar sculpture for the same reason.

Isomalt can also be used as a plasticizer for high methoxyl pectin films. It reduces the rigidity of the edible film by increasing free volume within the structure of the film. Additionally isomalt also reduces the water vapour permeability of the film, thus increasing the quality of the film as it reduces respiration rate, moisture migration, and loss of volatile compounds.

References

External links 
 

Disaccharides
E-number additives
Sugar alcohols
Sugar substitutes